Colmera is a Suco of East Timor and a district of the state capital Dili. It is governed by the Vera Cruz Administrative Post.

Buildings 

 Government Palace, Dili
 Hotel Timor

Politics 
In the 2004/2005 elections, Ricardo Guterres was elected Chefe de Suco. In the 2009 elections, Armenio Aleixo da Silva won  and in 2016 Armenio A. da Silva.

References 

Sucos of East Timor
Dili Municipality